Johannes Hermanus "Hans" Visser (born 17 December 1966) is a Dutch football manager and a former player. He is the assistant manager for NAC Breda.

Coaching career
He was the caretaker manager for FC Krylia Sovetov Samara in the Russian Premier League.

References

External links
 Profile by Russian Premier League

1966 births
Sportspeople from Alkmaar
Living people
Dutch footballers
Association football midfielders
AZ Alkmaar players
SBV Vitesse players
MVV Maastricht players
FC Utrecht players
Dutch expatriate footballers
Expatriate footballers in Belgium
FC Groningen players
Dutch football managers
Dutch expatriate football managers
Expatriate football managers in Belgium
K.R.C. Genk managers
Belgian Pro League managers
Expatriate football managers in Russia
PFC Krylia Sovetov Samara managers
Russian Premier League managers
K.R.C. Zuid-West-Vlaanderen players
Oud-Heverlee Leuven non-playing staff
K.R.C. Genk non-playing staff
SC Heerenveen non-playing staff
Footballers from North Holland